This is a list of the 179 members of the Parliament of Denmark, in the 2007 to 2011 session. They were elected at the 2007 general election.

Election results

Seat distribution
Below is the distribution of the 179 seats as it appeared after the 2007 election, as well at the distribution at the end of the term.

On 27 August 2008 New Alliance changed their name to Liberal Alliance. All mentions of the party on this page will be under the name Liberal Alliance.

Parliament members elected at the November 2007 election

Party and member changes after the November 2007 elections

Party changes
Below are all parliament members that have joined another party or become independent during the term.

Lasting member changes
Below are member changes that lasted through the entire term.

Temporary member changes 
Below are temporary member replacements during the term.

References

 
2007–2011